Mary E. Flowers (born July 31, 1951) is a Democratic member of the Illinois House of Representatives and serves as the House Deputy Majority Leader. She represented the 31st district from January 9, 1985 to January 13, 1993, represented the 21st district from January 13, 1993 to January 8, 2003, and represents the 31st district again since January 8, 2003. On January 14, 2021, Flowers became the longest serving African-American legislator in Illinois history.

Early life and education
Flowers was born on July 31, 1951, in Inverness, Mississippi. Her family moved to Chicago when she was a child. She attended local schools in Chicago, Kennedy King Community College and the University of Illinois at Chicago.

Political career
Mary Flowers was first elected to the 84th General Assembly as a Democrat from the 31st district in 1985. She is currently serving her 19th term as a member of the Illinois House of Representatives and serves as House Deputy Majority Leader for the 102nd General Assembly.

Illinois State Representative

Committees
During her tenure in the Illinois House of Representatives, Flowers has served on several different committees covering a range of topics and issues in the House of Representatives. Below is a list of her current and historical committee assignments.

As of 2022, Flowers has the following committee and subcommittee assignments:
Adoption & Child Welfare committee
Health Care Availability & Access committee (Vice-Chairperson)
Human Services committee
Mental Health & Addiction committee
Prescription Drug Affordability committee
Child Care Access & Early Childhood committee 
Medicaid Subcommittee

Legislation
Flowers' primary legislative focus has been on health and child welfare matters. She has been the principal sponsor of legislation related to medical patients rights, medical managed care reform, health insurance reforms, hospital and nursing home staffing standards, licensure of lay midwives, adverse health event reporting, health facility regulatory reform, medical and dental practice reforms, and public health/communicable disease control.

Flowers has been the primary sponsor of several bills that became law, including the following list:

Representative Flowers supports universal health care, and has repeatedly filed related legislation and conducted public hearings to promote such reforms throughout her legislative career – House Bill 311, The Illinois Universal Health Care Act – of the 97th General Assembly is the primary model.

Flowers has emphasized the safety of children in substitute care within the child welfare system regulated and administered by the Illinois Department of Children and Family Services, an agency and system that has experienced repeated tragedies and the subject of continuous judicial oversight.

Flowers has received awards during her tenure, including 1993 "Legislator of the Year" award from Illinois Alcoholism and Drug Dependence Association, which is now the Illinois Association for Behavioral Health Care.

Personal life 
Flowers was married to Daniel Coutee; the couple had one daughter, Makeda. Coutee died in September 2019. Flowers also has two grandchildren.

Electoral history

References

External links
Representative Mary E. Flowers (D) 31st District, Illinois General Assembly
98th, 97th, 96th, 95th94th, 93rd
 
Mary E. Flowers, Illinois House Democrats

Democratic Party members of the Illinois House of Representatives
1951 births
Living people
Women state legislators in Illinois
People from Inverness, Mississippi
African-American state legislators in Illinois
African-American women in politics
21st-century American politicians
21st-century American women politicians
21st-century African-American women
21st-century African-American politicians
20th-century African-American people
20th-century African-American women